Hollywood Daffy is a 1946 Warner Bros. Merrie Melodies cartoon, starring Daffy Duck. The cartoon was written by Michael Maltese and was released on June 22, 1946.

Friz Freleng was originally intended to direct the short, but ultimately passed on the idea as he was unsatisfied with the story, and refused to draw the animation layouts. Hawley Pratt, Freleng's layout artist, was able to complete the short, though both men were left uncredited.

Plot
The film begins with a pack of wolves howling in the center of Hollywood (a reference to Hollywood and Vine) as a spot for men looking to pick up women ("wolves" in the slang of the day). Daffy, having travelled to Hollywood, attempts to get into the "Warmer Bros." studio to see movie stars. However, the abrasive Keystone Kops-like security guard with a Joe Besser-like voice will not let him pass through the gate. After unsuccessfully endeavoring to enter the studio by way of various disguises and being thrown out each time, culminating with Daffy posing as a film director, but ultimately this disguise is exposed as well. Daffy finally declares that he won't leave until he literally "sees (movie) stars." The guard agrees to figuratively show him the stars, then bashes Daffy over the head and throws him out of the studio, where the dazed Daffy can see all the stars he wants...circling his head.

Hollywood celebrities featured in the cartoon
 Daffy says he would love to meet Lauren Bacall.
 The cop allows Bette Davis (voiced by Sara Berner) and Johnny Weissmuller (swinging from a vine dressed as Tarzan) to enter the studio, because they're employees of the studio.
 When trying to enter the studio, Daffy disguises himself as Charlie Chaplin (in his signature outfit), Jimmy Durante, Bing Crosby (voiced by Richard Bickenbach, who imitated Crosby often in Looney Tunes cartoons)  and an Academy Award statue. When the cop questions whether Daffy is really an Oscar, Daffy indicates that "J.L." is waiting for him, a reference to Jack L. Warner, head of production at Warner Brothers (see Freleng's "Ain't That Ducky" for another reference to "J.L." by Daffy.)
 When Daffy drives the cop through the studio, he passes the dressing rooms of Abbott and Costello (with the same shape as their bodies), Ann Sheridan (also as shapely as the actress, and surrounded by several bear traps) and Jimmy Durante (whose house has the same shape as his profile, including his famous, large nose), who has a bear trap on his leg.
 Jack Benny is seen trying to get an Oscar statue by playing a gaming machine.
 Daffy compares the cop with Errol Flynn.
 When Daffy literally sees stars after being hit on the head, he claims that he recognizes Hedy Lamarr, Alexis Smith, Dorothy Lamour, Baby Snooks and Ann Sheridan.

See also
 List of Daffy Duck cartoons
 Looney Tunes Golden Collection: Volume 5
 Daffy Duck in Hollywood

References

External links

Merrie Melodies short films
1946 animated films
1946 short films
1946 films
Short films directed by Friz Freleng
Animation based on real people
Cultural depictions of Charlie Chaplin
Cultural depictions of Bing Crosby
Cultural depictions of Johnny Weissmuller
Cultural depictions of Jimmy Durante
Films about Hollywood, Los Angeles
Daffy Duck films
Films scored by Carl Stalling
Animated films set in Los Angeles
Films set in studio lots
1940s Warner Bros. animated short films
Films with screenplays by Michael Maltese